The Prix Iris for Best Casting is an annual film award, presented by Québec Cinéma as part of its Prix Iris awards program, to honour the year's best casting in films made within the Cinema of Quebec.

The award was presented for the first time at the 19th Quebec Cinema Awards in 2017.

2010s

2020s

See also
Canadian Screen Award for Best Casting in a Film

References

External links 

Awards established in 2017
Casting awards
Casting
Quebec-related lists